Amouskositte, or Amo-sgiasite, Prince of Chota ("Dreadful Water"), of Great Tellico was the son of Moytoy of Tellico and attempted to succeed him as "Emperor of the Cherokee", a title given his father by Alexander Cuming.  Few Cherokee recognized him as their First Beloved Man, and by 1753 both he and Tellico had become eclipsed by Kanagatucko (Old Hop) and Chota.

18th-century Cherokee people
18th-century Native Americans
Native American leaders
Year of death unknown
18th-century births
18th-century deaths
People of pre-statehood Tennessee